Pañcika is a yaksha and consort of Hārītī, with whom he is said to have fathered 500 children.

According to the Mahavamsa, Pañcika was the commander-in-chief of the yakṣa army of Vaiśravaṇa and had another 27 yakṣa generals under his orders.

Pañcika was often represented holding a lance and a bag of jewels or money together with Hariti in the Greco-Buddhist art of Gandhara, where they illustrated marital love following the intervention of the Buddha. The two figures "were very popular in Gandhara in the latter part of the second century, and their statues are many." When depicted holding a spear, he also signals his role as the chief of the Yakṣas. The iconography of Pancika was eventually merged with that of Vaiśravaṇa.

See also
 Vaiśravaṇa
 Manibhadra

References

Yakshas
Buddhist gods
Twenty-Four Protective Deities